Scheherazade and Other Stories is the sixth studio album by the English progressive rock band Renaissance, released in 1975. Some critics consider it their best album, although others prefer earlier albums. This is the first album in which Renaissance (Annie Haslam's version) did not use quotes from actual classical pieces and the first not to feature any songwriting credits from the original members. Contrary to popular belief, "Song of Scheherazade" is not based on Nikolai Rimsky-Korsakov's Scheherazade, but does have a brief recurring motif that alludes to that work.

History
There is confusion over where the sections of "Song of Scheherazade" begin and end. This was caused by the fact that "Fanfare" and "The Betrayal" together sound like a single section, while "Festival Preparations" has two distinct parts of its own (4:00 and 1:11 in length). This confusion was reflected in the packaging and labels of original LP copies of this album, and in the mis-titling of "Festival Preparations" (part 1) as "The Young Prince and Princess" on the 1990 Tales of 1001 Nights, Volume I compilation.

Also, as has been admitted by the administrators of the official Renaissance site, Northern Lights, assigning exact composing credits to the individual sections is difficult, since the composers borrowed themes from each other. For example, based on the official credits, which differ slightly between the actual album package and the official Renaissance site, a particular melodic phrase ends up being attributed to both Dunford ("The Sultan") and Tout ("Fugue for the Sultan"); lyricist Betty Thatcher is not credited for her lyrics on "Finale" (which are repeated from "The Sultan").

"Trip to the Fair" was about Annie Haslam's first date with Roy Wood.

"Ocean Gypsy" has since been covered by Blackmore's Night.

Track listing
Side one
 "Trip to the Fair" (Michael Dunford, Betty Thatcher, John Tout) - 10:50
 "The Vultures Fly High" (Dunford, Thatcher) - 3:07
 "Ocean Gypsy" (Dunford, Thatcher) - 7:06

Side two
 "Song of Scheherazade" - 24:38
 a. "Fanfare" (Tout) - 0:38
 b. "The Betrayal" (Jon Camp, Dunford, Tout) - 2:05
 c. "The Sultan" (Dunford, Thatcher) - 4:45
 d. "Love Theme" (Camp) - 2:42
 e. "The Young Prince and Princess as told by Scheherazade" (Dunford, Thatcher) - 2:29
 f. "Festival Preparations" (Camp, Dunford, Tout) - 5:10
 g. "Fugue for the Sultan" (Tout) - 2:10
 h. "The Festival" (Dunford, Thatcher) - 2:10
 i. "Finale" (Camp, Dunford, Tout) - 2:29

Personnel

Renaissance
Annie Haslam – lead and backing vocals
Michael Dunford – acoustic guitars, backing vocals
John Tout – piano, organ, backing vocals
Jon Camp – bass, bass pedals, lead vocals on track 4c, backing vocals 
Terence Sullivan – drums, percussion, backing vocals

Additional musicians
 Tony Cox : orchestral arrangements
 London Symphony Orchestra : orchestrations

Production
David Hitchcock - producer
John Kurlander - engineer
Patrick Stapley - assistant engineer
Hipgnosis - cover design
W.T. (Terry) Penman - keyboards/stage manager

Notes

References

1975 albums
Renaissance (band) albums
Albums produced by Dave Hitchcock
Sire Records albums
RCA Records albums
Albums with cover art by Hipgnosis
Music based on One Thousand and One Nights